Wigton is a civil parish and town in the Borough of Allerdale in Cumbria, England.  It contains 51 listed buildings that are recorded in the National Heritage List for England.  Of these, one is listed at Grade II*, the middle of the three grades, and the others are at Grade II, the lowest grade.  Most of the listed buildings are in or near the town centre, and mainly comprise shops and houses.  There are also churches, public houses, hotels, schools, a bank, and a memorial drinking fountain.  Further from the town centre, the listed buildings include a farmhouse and barn, a former mill, a war memorial, and a milestone.


Key

Buildings

References

Citations

Sources

Lists of listed buildings in Cumbria
Listed buildings in